Benjamin Axus (born 28 September 1994) is a French judoka.

He participated at the 2018 World Judo Championships, winning a medal.

He won one of the bronze medals in his event at the 2022 Judo Grand Slam Paris held in Paris, France.

On 12 November 2022 he won a gold medal at the 2022 European Mixed Team Judo Championships as part of team France.

References

External links
 
 

1994 births
Living people
French male judoka
Competitors at the 2018 Mediterranean Games
21st-century French people